Ydstebøhamn or Ystabøhamn is the administrative centre of Kvitsøy municipality in Rogaland county, Norway.  The village is located on the southern shore of the island of Kvitsøy.  The village has a ferry quay which receives regular ferries from the town of Skudeneshavn on the island of Karmøy across the Boknafjorden to the north, and to the village of Mekjarvik in Randaberg municipality across the Kvitsøyfjorden on the mainland to the south. The planned Rogfast undersea tunnel will connect Kvitsøy to the mainland to the north and south as part of the government's goal of providing a ferry-free European route E39 highway along the west coast of Norway.

This means that over 70% of the municipal population lives in the village.

The village is an important fishing port, especially focusing on shellfish.  The Kvitsøy Lighthouse lies atop a small hill on the northwestern edge of the village.

References

Villages in Rogaland
Kvitsøy